Pulsarella is a genus of predatory sea snails, marine gastropod mollusks in the family Borsoniidae.

Species
Species within the genus Pulsarella include:
 Pulsarella clevei (Jousseaume, 1883)
 Pulsarella cognata (E. A. Smith, 1877)
 Pulsarella fultoni (G.B. Sowerby III, 1888)
 Pulsarella komakimonos (Otuka, 1935)

References

 Laseron, C. 1954. Revision of the New South Wales Turridae (Mollusca). Australian Zoological Handbook. Sydney : Royal Zoological Society of New South Wales 1-56, pls 1-12.
 Kilburn R.N. (1986). Turridae (Mollusca: Gastropoda) of southern Africa and Mozambique. Part 3. Subfamily Borsoniinae. Annals of the Natal Museum. 27: 633-720.

Further reading
  Bouchet P., Kantor Yu.I., Sysoev A. & Puillandre N. (2011) A new operational classification of the Conoidea. Journal of Molluscan Studies 77: 273-308.
 

 
Gastropod genera